Story artist is a credit given to additional screenwriters on animated films who do not share in the screenplay or story credit, as can be seen on Pixar and Disney animated films.

Animation
Film and video terminology
Screenwriting